Steel Talons is a 3D combat flight simulator arcade game released by Atari Games in 1991. The player takes on the role of a pilot for an "AT1196 Steel Talons combat helicopter". Steel Talons was ported to the Sega Genesis, Atari Lynx, Atari Falcon, and the Super Nintendo Entertainment System. A Jaguar port was announced, but never released.

Gameplay 

Steel Talons is an air combat arcade game. The player flies a helicopter equipped with a machine gun, rockets, and a limited number of air-to-surface guided missiles. It originated as a two-player cockpit arcade cabinet with both cooperative and competitive modes. In single-player mode or cooperative two-player mode, there are 19 missions. In competitive mode, players attempt to destroy each other's helicopter.

The arcade version has a joystick, analog collective lever on the left side that controls the altitude of the helicopter, and rudder pedals. The back of the seat has a speaker thumps when the player's helicopter is hit. It has a button called "real heli mode" which makes flying more difficult, but also allows more freedom of movement and can be an advantage during multiplayer games.

Development

Release 

The game's date of publication is listed by the United States Copyright Office as August 23, 1991. In September 1991, Steel Talons was shown at the 1991 Amusement & Music Operators Association (AMOA) expo in Las Vegas. In November 1991, the game was released internationally, by Sega in Japan and by Atari in Europe.

It was ported to the Sega Genesis, Atari Lynx, Atari Falcon, and the Super Nintendo Entertainment System. A Jaguar port was announced, but never released.

Reception 

In the United States, it topped the RePlay arcade charts for dedicated arcade cabinets in October 1991, and then the deluxe cabinet charts from November 1991 to February 1992, before topping it again in April 1992. In Japan, Game Machine listed Steel Talons in its March 15, 1992 issue as the third most-successful upright arcade unit of the month.

Upon its AMOA 1991 debut, The One magazine compared the arcade game favorably with Taito's 3D helicopter simulation Air Inferno (1990), stating "Atari has gone even further, making it a lot easier to play, without compromising the complexity of the controls." They said that, despite "the complexity of the controls, the game is a classic". Sinclair User listed it among several games making the "best use of 3-D technology" at the show, and later gave it an 87% score upon its European release. Julian Rignall of Computer and Video Games gave it a 96% rating.

The Amusement & Music Operators Association (AMOA) nominated the game for the "Most Innovative New Technology" award in 1992.

GameFan reviewed the Sega Genesis version, scoring it 172 out of 200.

References

External links 
 Steel Talons at GameFAQs
 Steel Talons at Giant Bomb
 Steel Talons at Killer List of Videogames
 Steel Talons at MobyGames

1991 video games
Arcade video games
Atari arcade games
Atari Lynx games
Atari ST games
Combat flight simulators
Cooperative video games
Cancelled Atari Jaguar games
Head-to-head arcade video games
Helicopter video games
NuFX games
Sega arcade games
Sega Genesis games
Super Nintendo Entertainment System games
Tengen (company) games
Video games scored by Brad Fuller
Video games developed in the United States